John Richard Kilbee (born 24 July 1947) is an English former first-class cricketer.

The son of Lieutenant Laurence Kilbee, he was born at Victoria in British Hong Kong during his father's military service there. He was educated in England at The King's School, Canterbury before going up to St Edmund Hall, Oxford. While studying at Oxford, he played first-class cricket for Oxford University in 1968 and 1969, making eight appearances. He scored 70 runs in these matches with a high score of 18 not out, while with his right-arm medium pace he took 8 wickets at an average of 33.75, with best figures of 4 for 96.

References

External links

1947 births
Living people
People from Victoria, Hong Kong
People educated at The King's School, Canterbury
Alumni of St Edmund Hall, Oxford
English cricketers
Oxford University cricketers